Illyricus may refer to:
 Bogumil Vošnjak (1882–1955), a Slovene and Yugoslav jurist, politician, diplomat, author and legal historian
 Matthias Flacius Illyricus (1520–1575), a Lutheran reformer
 Saint Illyricus of Mount Myrsinon in the Peloponnesus (see April 3 (Eastern Orthodox liturgics)

Species and subspecies
 Squalius illyricus, a ray-finned fish species
 Astragalus monspessulanus subsp. illyricus, a plant subspecies

See also
 Illyricum (disambiguation)
 Illyrians (disambiguation)
 Illyrian (disambiguation)
 Illyria (disambiguation)